The St. John's Fort is a historical fort in Melaka City, Melaka, Malaysia.

History
The fort was reconstructed from existing Portuguese fortifications during the Dutch period in the 18th century to guard against landward attacks. It was once a private Portuguese chapel dedicated to St. John the Baptist.

Architecture
The fort is located at the top of St. John's Hill. It was built from Laterite stone and bricks. The fort had only one entrance and its outer walls range between 3-4 meters high.

Exhibitions
The fort has canons that are facing inland because the Dutch feared inland threats from Acehnese and Bugis invaders more than maritime invasions.

See also
 List of tourist attractions in Malacca

References

Buildings and structures in Malacca City
Forts in Malaysia